The 11th Guldbagge Awards ceremony, presented by the Swedish Film Institute, honored the best Swedish films of 1974 and 1975, and took place on 13 October 1975. The Last Adventure directed by Jan Halldoff was presented with the award for Best Film.

Awards
 Best Film: The Last Adventure by Jan Halldoff
 Best Director: Hans Alfredson for Egg! Egg! A Hardboiled Story
 Best Actor: Göran Stangertz for The Last Adventure
 Best Actress: Lis Nilheim for Maria
 Special Achievement: Per Åhlin for Dunderklumpen!

References

External links
Official website
Guldbaggen on Facebook
Guldbaggen on Twitter
11th Guldbagge Awards at Internet Movie Database

1975 in Sweden
1975 film awards
Guldbagge Awards ceremonies
October 1975 events in Europe
1970s in Stockholm